The NCAA Division II Football Championship is an American college football tournament played annually to determine a champion at the NCAA Division II level. It was first held in 1973, as a single-elimination tournament with eight teams. The tournament field has subsequently been expanded three times; in 1988 it became 16 teams, in 2004 it became 24 teams, and in 2016 it became 28 teams.

The National Championship game has been held in seven different cities; Sacramento, California (1973–1975), Wichita Falls, Texas (1976–1977), Longview, Texas (1978), Albuquerque, New Mexico (1979–1980), McAllen, Texas (1981–1985), Florence, Alabama (1986–2013), and Kansas City, Kansas (2014–2017). The 2018 and 2019 games were played at the McKinney ISD Stadium and Community Event Center in McKinney, Texas. Since 1994, the games have been broadcast on ESPN.

Prior to 1973, for what was then called the NCAA College Division, national champions were selected by polls conducted at the end of each regular season by two major wire services; in some years the two polls named different number one teams. From 1964 to 1972, postseason bowls crowned four regional champions. NCAA Division II bowl games still exist, but only as postseason contests for teams not qualifying for the championship playoffs.

NCAA College Division wire service national champions

Polls were conducted by the Associated Press (AP) and United Press International (UPI) at the end of each regular season. The AP polled a panel of writers, while UPI polled a panel of coaches.

National champions by polling

While the NCAA started Division II playoffs in 1973, AP and UPI still conducted their polls these years.

NCAA Division II champions

Since 1973, a post-season tournament has been held to determine the Division II Champion.  The current format, in use since 2016, features 28 teams.  The 28 teams are organized into 4 super-regions of 7 teams each, the top-seeded team in each super-region gets a bye during the first round.  The champions of the four super-regions meet in the semi-final round, and the winners of the two semi-final games meet in a neutral-site championship game.  Prior to the championship game, the semi-final games are held at the home stadiums of the two highest-seeded remaining teams.  The championship game has been played at several sites through history, starting in 2018 it was held at the McKinney Independent School District Stadium, a 12,000 seat facility that opened in August, 2018.

† Mississippi College's 1989 tournament participation, along with its championship, were vacated by the NCAA Committee on Infractions.

Team titles

Championship game appearances

Programs that no longer compete in Division II are indicated in italics with a pink background.
{| class="wikitable sortable" style="font-size:95%; width: 70%; text-align: left;"
|-
!style="width:12em;"|Team
!Appearances
!Years
|-
| Northwest Missouri State || 10 ||1998, 1999, 2005, 2006, 2007, 2008, 2009, 2013, 2015, 2016
|-bgcolor=lightpink
| North Dakota State || 7 || 1981, 1983, 1984, 1985, 1986, 1988, 1990
|-
| Grand Valley State || 6 || 2001, 2002, 2003, 2005, 2006, 2009
|-
| Valdosta State || 6 || 2002, 2004, 2007, 2012, 2018, 2021
|-
| Pittsburg State || 5 || 1991, 1992, 1995, 2004, 2011
|-bgcolor=lightpink
| North Alabama || 5 || 1985, 1993, 1994, 1995, 2016
|-bgcolor=lightpink
| Jacksonville State || 4 || 1977, 1989, 1991, 1992
|-
| Carson–Newman || 3 || 1996, 1998, 1999
|-bgcolor=lightpink
| Delaware || 3 || 1974, 1978, 1979
|-
| Ferris State || 3 || 2018, 2021, 2022
|-
| Delta State || 2 || 2000, 2010
|-bgcolor=lightpink
| Eastern Illinois || 2 || 1978, 1980
|-
| Indiana (PA) || 2 || 1990, 1993
|-
| Minnesota–Duluth || 2 || 2008, 2010
|-
| Minnesota State–Mankato || 2 || 2014, 2019
|-bgcolor=lightpink
| North Dakota || 2 || 2001, 2003
|-bgcolor=lightpink
| Northern Colorado || 2 || 1996, 1997
|-bgcolor=lightpink
| Portland State || 2 || 1987, 1988
|-bgcolor=lightpink
| Texas State || 2 || 1981, 1982
|-bgcolor=lightpink
| Troy || 2 || 1984, 1987
|-bgcolor=lightpink
| Western Kentucky || 2 || 1973, 1975
|-
| West Florida || 2 || 2017, 2019
|-bgcolor=lightpink
| Akron || 1 || 1976
|-
| Bloomsburg || 1 || 2000
|-bgcolor=lightpink
| Cal Poly || 1 || 1980
|-bgcolor=lightpink
| Central Michigan || 1 || 1974
|-
| Central State || 1 || 1983
|-
| Colorado Mines || 1 || 2022
|-
| CSU–Pueblo || 1 || 2014
|-bgcolor=lightpink
| Lehigh || 1 || 1977
|-
| Lenoir–Rhyne || 1 || 2013
|-bgcolor=lightpink
| Louisiana Tech || 1 || 1973
|-bgcolor=lightpink
| Montana State || 1 || 1976
|-
| New Haven || 1 || 1997
|-
| Northern Michigan || 1 || 1975
|-
| Shepherd || 1 || 2015
|-bgcolor=lightpink
| South Dakota || 1 || 1986
|-
| Texas A&M–Commerce || 1 || 2017
|-
| Texas A&M–Kingsville || 1 || 1994
|-bgcolor=lightpink
| UC Davis || 1 || 1982
|-
| Wayne State (MI) || 1 || 2011
|-
| Winston-Salem State || 1 || 2012
|-bgcolor=lightpink
| Youngstown State || 1 || 1979
|-
| Mississippi College || 0 || †
|}

Of the programs that no longer compete in D-II, Akron, Central Michigan, Jacksonville State, Louisiana Tech, Texas State, Troy and Western Kentucky currently compete in Division I FBS. All others compete in Division I FCS.

Notes
† Mississippi College's 1989 tournament participation, along with its championship, were vacated by the NCAA Committee on Infractions.
  During Texas State's entire tenure in Division II, its name was Southwest Texas State University. The school adopted its current name in 2003.
  During Troy's entire tenure in Division II, its name was Troy State University. The school adopted its current name in 2005.

Teams that moved to Division I
Most of the participants in early national championship games have moved into Division I, the main catalyst for their moves being the creation of Division I-AA, now the Division I Football Championship Subdivision (FCS), in 1978. The following Division II title game participants later moved to Division I:

Division I FBS (formerly I-A)
Akron (1976 runner-up)
Central Michigan (1974 champion)
Jacksonville State (1992 champion; 1977, 1989, and 1991 runner-up)
Louisiana Tech (1973 champion)
Texas State (champion 1981, 1982 as Southwest Texas State)
Troy (1984 and 1987 champion as Troy State'')
Western Kentucky (1973 and 1975 runner-up)

Division I FCS (formerly I-AA)
Cal Poly (1980 champion)
Delaware (1979 champion; 1974 and 1978 runner-up)
Eastern Illinois (1978 champion; 1980 runner-up)
Lehigh (champion 1977)
Montana State (champion 1976)
North Alabama (champion 1993, 1994, and 1995; runner-up 1985 and 2016)
North Dakota (champion 2001, runner-up 2003)
North Dakota State (champion 1965, 1968, 1969, 1983, 1985, 1986, 1988, and 1990; runner-up 1981 and 1984)
Northern Colorado (champion 1996 and 1997)
Portland State (runner-up 1987 and 1988)
South Dakota (runner-up 1986)
Texas A&M–Commerce (champion 2017)
UC Davis (runner-up 1982)
Youngstown State (runner-up 1979)

Postseason bowls

Regional bowls
From 1964 to 1972, four regional bowl games were played in order to provide postseason action, however these games took place after the AP and UPI polls were completed, therefore these games did not factor in selecting a national champion for the College Division. The bowl games were:

Winners of regional bowls

Playoff bowls
From 1973 to 1977, some of the tournament games were also known by bowl names;
 In 1973, one of the first-round games was the final playing of the Boardwalk Bowl.
 From 1973 through 1975, the two semifinal games were the Grantland Rice Bowl and the Pioneer Bowl, while the final game was the Camellia Bowl.
 In 1976 and 1977, the two semifinal games were the Grantland Rice Bowl and the Knute Rockne Bowl, while the final game was the Pioneer Bowl.

See also 
 List of NCAA Division II football programs
 List of NCAA Division II Football Championship appearances by team
 NCAA Division II bowl games
 College Football Playoff (FBS)
 NCAA Division I Football Championship (FCS)
 NCAA Division III Football Championship
 NAIA Football Championship

References

External links
 NCAA Division II Football Championship history
 NCAA Division II Football Bowl Games